Aleksandr Pavlovich Nikulin (born 14 February 1979) is a former Russian football player.

External links
 

1979 births
Sportspeople from Samara, Russia
Living people
Russian footballers
PFC Krylia Sovetov Samara players
Russian Premier League players
FC Lada-Tolyatti players
FC Zhemchuzhina Sochi players
FC Anzhi Makhachkala players
FC Ural Yekaterinburg players
Association football midfielders
FC Orenburg players